Townsend Hotel may refer to:
 Townsend Hotel (Birmingham, Michigan), a hotel in Detroit
 Townsend Hotel (Casper, Wyoming), an NRHP-listed property in Wyoming

See also
 Townsend (disambiguation)